Enis Alushi (born 22 December 1985) is a Kosovan retired professional footballer who played as a midfielder.

Club career

1. FC Nürnberg
On 28 July 2016, Alushi joined 2. Bundesliga side 1. FC Nürnberg. His debut with 1. FC Nürnberg came on 6 August in first matchday of 2016–17 2. Bundesliga against Dynamo Dresden, starting the match before being substituted off in the last minute for Even Hovland.

Loan at Maccabi Haifa
On 17 January 2017, Alushi joined Israeli Premier League side Maccabi Haifa, on a five-month-long loan. On 30 January 2017, he made his debut in a 2–2 home draw against Maccabi Tel Aviv after being named in the starting line-up.

Return from loan
On 5 August 2017, Alushi after return from loan made his debut with reserve team in a 4–0 home win against FC Pipinsried, starting the match before being substituted off in the 74th minute for Issaka Mouhaman. On 19 May 2018, it was confirmed that Alushi had left 1. FC Nürnberg.

Retirement
On 17 June 2019, His wife, Fatmire Alushi via a photo on their official Instagram account announced the retirement of Enis and the starting the work as football agent.

International career

Kosovo
On 2 March 2014, Alushi received a call-up from Kosovo for the first permitted by FIFA match against Haiti and made his debut after being named in the starting line-up.

Personal life
Alushi was born in Mitrovica, SFR Yugoslavia from Kosovo Albanian parents. In June 2011, he began dating fellow footballer Fatmire Bajramaj and the couple announced its engagement the following year. Shortly after, in September 2012, both suffered anterior cruciate ligament injuries in matches within 72 hours of each other. The couple got married in December 2013.

Career statistics

Club

International

References

External links

1985 births
Living people
Sportspeople from Mitrovica, Kosovo
Kosovo Albanians
Kosovan footballers
Kosovo international footballers
German footballers
German people of Kosovan descent
German people of Albanian descent
Germany youth international footballers
Association football midfielders
Regionalliga players
Oberliga (football) players
1. FC Köln II players
SV Wehen Wiesbaden players
SV Wehen Wiesbaden II players
1. FC Kaiserslautern II players
1. FC Nürnberg II players
3. Liga players
SC Paderborn 07 players
2. Bundesliga players
1. FC Köln players
1. FC Kaiserslautern players
FC St. Pauli players
1. FC Nürnberg players
Israeli Premier League players
Maccabi Haifa F.C. players
Kosovan expatriate footballers
Expatriate footballers in Israel
Kosovan expatriate sportspeople in Israel